Bakasuran is a 2023 Indian Tamil-language crime film written and directed by Mohan G. Kshatriyan. The film stars Selvaraghavan and Natarajan Subramaniam in the lead roles along with Mansoor Ali Khan, Radha Ravi and Saravana Subbiah in other pivotal roles. The film was released on 17 February 2023.

Cast

 Selvaraghavan as Beemarasu / Rajasekaran
 Natarajan Subramaniam as Major Arulvarman / Varma
 Radha Ravi as Natarajan
 K. Rajan
 Ramachandran Durairaj
 Saravana Subbiah
 Cool Suresh as pimp
 Gunanithi
 Tarakshi
 Mansoor Ali Khan for a song
 Devadarshini as Inspector
 P. L. Thenappan
 Sasi Laya
 Lavanya
 Pondy Ravi
 Kuty Gopi
 Arunodhayan
 Jayam Sk Gopi

Production
The film's director Mohan G. Kshatriyan revealed that Bakasuran was based on real-life incidents that he came across in life. Production began on the film in December 2021, with Selvaraghavan announced as the lead actor. The first look poster of the film was released on 26 August 2022.

Music 
The music of the film is composed by Sam C. S. The first single titled Siva Sivaayam was released on 21 September 2022. The second single titled "Kaathama" was released on 17 October 2022.

Reception 
The film was released on 17 February 2023.

A critic from Times of India noted the film's "okayish message is let down by preachy and predictable writing" and that "as for the screenplay, it is pretty direct and despite being an investigative thriller, predictable for the most part". A critic from Cinema Express noted "the film identifies the right problems, offers superficial solutions, vilifies the wrong things, and exposes its own skewed perceptions" while also pointing out the ironical 'Item song' in the film which supposedly cares about women. A reviewer from The Hindustan Times called the film "problematic".
Nidhima Taneja from The Print gave 2 out of 5 starts and criticised the movie and called movie plot outdated while praising Selvaraghavan's performance . She said, "It is a template borrowed from when women were deployed as objects to satiate details of an over-sexualised plot."
 Moviecrow gave 2 out of 5 stars calling it a "Outdated Cringe Fest" and criticised the screenplay and the preachy nature of the "done and dusted messaging thrown at the faces of the audience". Sowmya Rajendran of the The News Minute gave 1.5 out of 5 stars, criticised the movie and called that Baksuran fails as a thriller because it offers nothing new. Yuvashree from the ABP News wrote that "On the whole, you can see Bakasuran for Selvaraghavan, otherwise there is nothing notable to say. BBC News noted that "Overall, while the first half of the film is somewhat interesting, many reviews point out that the second half is somewhat boring. In addition, campaigns such as the use of mobile phones and telling only women to be modest have also come under criticism. But in terms of cinematography, all the reviews have pointed out that this film is better than Mohan ji's previous films." K Ramkumar from Dinamani wrote "Bahasuran has evolved from a thought of 50 years ago. After many centuries, women are only now coming out of their ovens and starting to learn. 'Bakasuran' has come as a story written by someone who watched this with anxiety." IndiaGlitz gave 2 out of 5 stars, it appreciated the Sam C.S music and noted remaining details are in line with the filmmakers' vision and said "By selecting a topic that can affect people from any caste, Mohan G has made an effort to stay out of the spotlight. But sadly, he has produced a boring narration that is difficult to watch."

References

External links 
 

2020s Tamil-language films
2023 films
2023 crime films
Indian crime films